Juho Paksujalka (29 April 1883, Hiitola - 13 September 1951, Anjala) was a Finnish farmer and politician. He was a member of the Parliament of Finland from 1933 to 1936 and again from 1939 to 1948, representing the Agrarian League.

References

1883 births
1951 deaths
People from Lakhdenpokhsky District
People from Viipuri Province (Grand Duchy of Finland)
Centre Party (Finland) politicians
Members of the Parliament of Finland (1933–36)
Members of the Parliament of Finland (1939–45)
Members of the Parliament of Finland (1945–48)
Finnish people of World War II